Bruce "Digger" Hargreaves (born 1953) is an Australian amateur athlete, corporate speaker and businessperson. He has completed 154 marathons and 45 ultramarathons as at December 2021.

Bruce is a Melbourne Marathon Spartan Legend, meaning that he has completed it every year since it began in 1978 along with 4 other runners. He was the Australian Ambassador for the Comrades Marathon-A 90km road race in South Africa, the worlds largest Ultra Marathon from 2008 until 2018, and in 2018 he was appointed as one of the only 2 "Comrades Marathons Ambassadors at Large", and also in 2018 he was awarded the prestigious "Spirit of Comrades" award. Bruce has also completed the event seven times.

He has race directed, coordinated and advised numerous races and is currently the Race Director of both the Port Morseby and Tamborine Mountain Marathon and was a regular pacer in various marathons around both Australia and the world. A serious illness in 2018 slowed him down, so he volunteered as a "sweeper" at the Gold Coast Marathon and still regularly runs Marathons.

Bruce has a personal best in the marathon of 2:47:02. He has run a sub-3 hour marathon nine times.

References

Living people
Australian male long-distance runners
Australian male marathon runners
1953 births